Oskar Wiljam Kaipio (8 May 1874, Laukaa – 3 May 1918, Uusikirkko) was a Finnish journalist, farmer and politician. He was a member of the Parliament of Finland from 1908 till 1910 and represented the Social Democratic Party of Finland (SDP). During the Finnish Civil War he sided with the Reds, was made prisoner by White troops and shot in Uusikirkko on 3 May 1918.

References

1874 births
1918 deaths
People from Laukaa
People from Vaasa Province (Grand Duchy of Finland)
Social Democratic Party of Finland politicians
Members of the Parliament of Finland (1908–09)
Members of the Parliament of Finland (1909–10)
People of the Finnish Civil War (Red side)
People executed by Finland by firing squad
20th-century executions by Finland